Mount Inflexible is a mountain in the Kananaskis Range of Alberta, Canada. It was named in 1922 after , a battlecruiser of the Royal Navy serving during the First World War.

Geology

Mount Inflexible is composed of sedimentary rock laid down during the Precambrian to Jurassic periods. Formed in shallow seas, this sedimentary rock was pushed east and over the top of younger rock during the Laramide orogeny.

Climate

Based on the Köppen climate classification, Mount Inflexible is located in a subarctic climate zone with cold, snowy winters, and mild summers. Winter temperatures can drop below  with wind chill factors below .

See also
 Geography of Alberta

References

Three-thousanders of Alberta
Alberta's Rockies